Miyuki is a feminine Japanese given name.

Miyuki may also refer to:

Miyuki (manga), a Japanese manga series by Mitsuru Adachi
Japanese destroyer Miyuki, a Fubuki-class destroyer in the Imperial Japanese Navy prior to World War II
Miyuki, the 29th scroll of The Tale of Genji

People with the surname
, Japanese footballer
, Japanese voice actress

Japanese-language surnames